Idaho is an unincorporated rural hamlet in Pike County, in the U.S. state of Ohio.

History
A post office was established in 1870, and remained in operation until 1964, at Idaho. An unmanned postal facility remains there, the only form of business or service at Idaho. The community was named after the Idaho Territory.

References

Unincorporated communities in Pike County, Ohio
Unincorporated communities in Ohio